Jira may refer to:

 Jira (given name)
 Jira (software), a bug-tracking, issue-tracking and project-management software application
 Jira (Toho) or Zilla, a fictional giant dinosaur-like monster
 Japan Industrial Robot Association or Japan Robot Association
 Jira (nahiyah), a nahiyah of Safad Sanjak under the Ottoman Empire
 La Jira, a festival celebrated in some areas of Spain, such as Oviñana
 Jira water, a drink made from cumin

See also
Jireh (disambiguation)